The football tournament at the 1973 Central American Games was the first to be held. The host city was Ciudad de Guatemala, Guatemala. All games took place between 24 November and 2 December 1973. The competition was age restricted, open to only those under 21 years of age. The top two placed teams earn a ticket to the 1974 Central American and Caribbean Games.

Teams

Final standings

Results

Top Scorers

References 

1973
Cen
1973